Chilean frigate Almirante Condell (PFG-06) was a  of the Chilean Navy, and was the third ship in the Chilean Navy to bear this name.

The class was built between 1969 and 1973, under Chilean modifications at Yarrow Shipbuilders in Scotstoun, Glasgow. Almirante Condell was delivered to Chile in 1973. She was decommissioned on 11 December 2007.

In March 2008, she was sold to Ecuador, along with her sister ship Almirante Lynch, and renamed BAE Eloy Alfaro (FM 01). Both ships were handed over to the Navy of Ecuador on 18 April 2008.

References

External links
 Chilean Navy Website (in Spanish)

Condell-class frigates
Ships built on the River Clyde
1972 ships
Frigates of the Ecuadorian Navy
Frigates of the Cold War